Merz and McLellan was a leading British electrical engineering consultancy based in Newcastle.

History
The firm was founded by Charles Merz and William McLellan in Newcastle upon Tyne in 1902 when McLellan joined Merz's existing firm established in 1899. The partnership was instrumental in designing the United Kingdom's first three-phase electrical supply network, on Tyneside, and for the next century continued to advise other Commonwealth countries on setting up their own networks.

In the early 1960s, Merz & McLellan started a scheme in the interest of reclaming land owned by the London Brick Company in Peterborough; James Price took up the position of senior resident engineer. This became known as the "Peterborough Dust Disposal Scheme".

In 1995 the partnership merged with the Parsons Brinckerhoff consultancy, and in 2000 the new owners announced that the Merz & McLellan name would be discontinued.

In 2010, Mott MacDonald consultancy announced that it had bought Merz and McLellan South Africa.

Selected contracts 
 1901: Neptune Bank Power Station
 1904: Carville Power Station, Wallsend, UK
 1908 & 1912: Electrification of Melbourne suburban railways in Victoria, Australia.
 1911: Electrification of North Eastern Railway (UK)
 1914-18: Mobile power stations for the battlefield
 1921: North Tees Power Station
 1925: Report on electrification of the New Zealand suburban systems in Auckland, Wellington, Christchurch and Dunedin. (including the Lyttelton railway line between Lyttelton and Christchurch
 1933-51: Dunston B power station, Dunston, Newcastle-Upon-Tyne, UK
 1940s: Orlando Power Station, Johannesburg, South Africa
 1950s: Kariba South dam power generators
 1950s: Wairakei Power Station Geothermal Power Station, New Zealand
 1953: Blyth A Power Station, Cambois, Northumberland, UK
 1960s: Bell Bay Power Station, Tasmania, Australia
 1962: Blyth B Power Station
 1969 Longannet Power Station
 1980-1993: Kariba South dam hydroelectric upgrade
 1989: Subiya oil-fired power station, Kuwait

Merz & McLellan firms still independent 
 Sinclair Knight Merz (Australia)

References 

Electrical engineering companies of the United Kingdom
Companies based in Newcastle upon Tyne
Consulting firms established in 1902
British companies established in 1902
1902 establishments in England
Engineering consulting firms of the United Kingdom